The 1983 Philadelphia mayoral election saw the election of Wilson Goode.

Goode won the Democratic nomination by defeating former mayor Frank Rizzo, as well as several minor candidates, in the Democratic primary.

Goode was elected the first African American mayor of Philadelphia.

Background
Before the election, a total of eighteen black mayors had been elected in United States cities with populations above 100,000.

At the time, there were incumbent black mayors in three of the other five United States cities with populations above 1 million people, Los Angeles (Tom Bradley), Chicago (Harold Washington), and Detroit (Coleman Young).

No Republican, and only Democrats, had been elected mayor since after the 1947 Philadelphia mayoral election.

At the time, blacks made up roughly 39% of registered voters in the city. White voters still outnumbered black voters 2 to 1.

Registered Democrats outnumbered registered Republicans in the city by 4 to 1.

Democratic primary
Goode positioned himself as a candidate that could unite the city. This contrasted with many voters' perception that Rizzo had divided the city along racial and ethnic lines.

Goode was fresh-faced, with this being his first campaign for elected office. He was also perceived as an efficient public servant.

In the primary, more than 30% of white voters cast their votes for Goode.

Race never became a major topic of the campaign.

The race saw a record total of votes cast for a Democratic primary.

Ron Brown, the deputy chairman of the Democratic National Committee, appeared at Goode's primary election night victory party at the Philadelphia Convention Center to promise the national party's support for the general election. The victory party was also attended by black mayors from other United States cities, including Marion Barry of Washington, D.C.

Candidates

Declared
 George G. Britt, Jr., management consultant and perennial candidate
 Anthony G. Bateman, attorney and former Assistant District Attorney
 Stephen S. Douglas, former aide to Lyndon LaRouche and candidate for Governor in 1980
 Wilson Goode, Philadelphia Managing Director
 Frank Lomento, pretzel vendor and perennial candidate
 Frank Rizzo, former Mayor

Withdrew
 Thomas A. Leonard III, Philadelphia Register of Wills (to run as an independent)

Results

Republican primary

Candidates

Declared
 Charles F. Dougherty, United States Representative for Pennsylvania's 4th congressional district
 John Egan, chairman of the Philadelphia Stock Exchange
 Tom Gola, former City Controller and Basketball Hall of Famer

Results

Independents and third parties

Independent
 Thomas A. Leonard III, Philadelphia Register of Wills

General election
Goode was able to project a managerial image for himself, and was able to make an image that was "nonthreatening" to white voters.

Results
Exit polling indicated that Goode received 98% of the support in black neighborhoods. An examination of sample voting districts indicated that Goode received between 27 and 28% of the vote in white neighborhoods. It was argued that a white candidate with the same credentials as Goode would likely have received 55% of the vote in the white neighborhoods.

References

1983
Philadelphia
1983 Pennsylvania elections
1980s in Philadelphia